The Loveday Fortunes is the second novel in the Loveday series written by Kate Tremayne.

Plot summary

When the Lovedays' banker is found dead in the river Thames, his legacy of debts and foolish investments plunges the family into financial chaos and leaves them facing ruin. As Adam struggles to face this new challenge, he falls in love with the mysterious gypsy woman Senara despite his father's censure. Meanwhile, St John, encouraged by his wife Meriel, throws in his lot with a gang of smugglers in order to win the riches both of them have always dreamed of. The growing Revolution in France also has repercussions for the family.

2000 British novels
Novels by Kate Tremayne
Historical romance novels